Jürgen Melzer and Leander Paes were the defending champions but decided not to participate together.
Melzer partnered up with Philipp Petzschner, while Paes played alongside Mahesh Bhupathi. However, neither couple were able to retain the title.
In the final, Max Mirnyi and Daniel Nestor won the title beating Michaël Llodra and Nenad Zimonjić 3–6, 6–1, [12–10].

Seeds

Draw

Finals

Top half

Bottom half

References
 Main Draw

Shanghai Rolex Masters - Doubles
2011 Shanghai Rolex Masters